Sir Syed College is a postgraduate institution situated in Taliparamba, Kerala, India. The college is affiliated to the Kannur University. The college runs post-graduate courses in science, commerce and arts. The college offers research facilities in botany and chemistry. The college is recognized under 2f of the UGC Act and reaccredited by NAAC at the A level.

Location
The college campus is located on a hillock at Karimbam, Taliparamba.

History
The college was established in 1967 by Cannanore District Muslim Educational Association (CDMEA) which is a Thalassery based NGO.  The college began in a temporary building at Karimbam junction.  The new campus at Pranthan Kunnu has more facilities like football and basketball grounds and a botanic garden.  The college has laboraties for the students of physics, botany and chemistry.

Attached institutions
 Sir Syed Institute for Technical Studies
 Keyi Sahib Training College
 Sir Syed Higher Secondary School

Affiliation
Sir Syed College, Taliparamba is affiliated to the Kannur University.

Notable alumni
Dr. Justice Kauser Edappagath, judge of Kerala High Court
John Brittas
Nikhila Vimal
P. K. Kunhalikutty
Mohammed Faizal P. P

See also
 Krishna Menon Women's College
 Payyannur College

References

Arts and Science colleges in Kerala
Colleges affiliated to Kannur University
Universities and colleges in Kannur district
Taliparamba
Educational institutions established in 1967
1967 establishments in Kerala